DJ Hero 2 is the sequel to DJ Hero, a spinoff of the Guitar Hero series. DJ Hero 2 was developed by FreeStyleGames, published by Activision and released worldwide in October 2010 for the Xbox 360, PlayStation 3, and Wii consoles. Like its predecessor, DJ Hero 2 simulates turntablism, the playing of two songs in mix, using a special turntable-based controller that includes the ability to crossfade between the two songs, and scratching the recording. Players are challenged to match these actions, shown through on-screen scrolling indicators in synchronization with the mix; correct actions boost the player's score, while correctly performing several consecutive actions can increase the player's scoring multiplier. Specifically marked sections of songs allow the player to freestyle through crossfading, scratching, or inserting music samples into the mix. The player is not penalized for failing to perform actions. The goal is to obtain a high score for each mix, earning the player a star rating from one to five, which helps to advance the player's progress through the game.

DJ Hero 2 on-disc setlist includes 83 mixes from over 100 different songs spanning 85 artists. Several mixes have been composed by professional DJs, including David Guetta, Deadmau5, DJ Qbert, Tiësto and RZA, who also appear as in-game avatars. The success of the first game eased the acquisition of music licenses for the sequel, and allowed the inclusion of more popular music.  However, licensing for such music remained a difficult barrier. Reviews found the setlist to provide better variety from the first game's heavier hip-hop influences. The game also supports downloadable content, both existing downloadable mixes from DJ Hero and new mixes since the sequel's release.

Setlist
The following table lists the mixes and their constituent songs that are available on the DJ Hero 2 disc. Most mixes involve two different songs, but others are beat juggles using the same core song on two different tracks for unique effects. Within the game's career mode, songs are arranged in six venues, and further into three or four song setlists, often featuring songs all mixed by the same DJ artist. In certain sets that feature a real-life artist, the player will perform as that artist's avatar within the game. The player must earn a certain number of stars from previous venues and setlists to unlock later ones. Other mixes are specifically designed as Battle Mixes to be played in the game's two-player DJ Battles mode.  All mixes are available to play in the game's Quickplay mode.

Reviewers found the soundtrack provided a wider range of genres, moving away from hip-hop and into house and dance genres, to appeal to more players. Matt Helgeson of Game Informer considered that the mixes were "uniformly great", and balanced popular artists with skilled DJ mixers. Eurogamer's Keza MacDonald stated the soundtrack was "faultless" and that while featuring a large number of songs from the club scene, the soundtrack is  "still a powerful draw if you don't know or even like the music". Official Xbox Magazine UKs Mike Channell believed the "mashups also feel even more playful this time around", creating new interpretations of the lyrics of songs through the mixing.  Cian Hassett of PALGN called the setlist "the most incredible fusion of contrasting genres known to man". Some critics commented that they felt the first game's track list was better; Damien Hatfield of IGN felt there was "more variety" in the original game's mix and better representation within certain genres, while Michael Brown of 1UP.com favored DJ Heros set for "how it mixed together frequently disparate tracks" and that many mixes in the sequel favored too much of one song in the mix.

Downloadable content

DJ Hero 2 supports downloadable content in the form of new mixes that can be purchased from the consoles' respective online stores. A free add-on allows players to purchase and play existing downloadable content from the first game to use within DJ Hero 2. Activision's February 2011 decision to shutter their Guitar Hero development initially stated that no further downloadable content will be forthcoming for the title, but due to "continued support" from their fanbase, Activision has since clarified it will continue to release Do the rolex sweep in downloadable content for the game. Activision has stated that it will provide packs in March and April 2011 based on work that was ongoing at the time of their closure of the Guitar Hero division.

References

External links
 Official website

Guitar Hero lists of songs